Bergen Township is a township in McLeod County, Minnesota, United States. The population was 1052 at the 2020 census.

History
Bergen Township was named after Bergen, in Norway.

Geography

Demographics
As of the census of 2000, there were 881 people, 297 households, and 237 families residing in the township. The population density was 24.9 people per square mile (9.6/km2). There were 304 housing units at an average density of 8.6/sq mi (3.3/km2). The racial makeup of the township was 96.37% White, 0.23% Native American, 0.34% Asian, 3.06% from other races. Hispanic or Latino of any race were 4.54% of the population.

There were 297 households, out of which 41.1% had children under the age of 18 living with them, 69.7% were married couples living together, 4.0% had a female householder with no husband present, and 19.9% were non-families. 14.1% of all households were made up of individuals, and 3.4% had someone living alone who was 65 years of age or older. The average household size was 2.97 and the average family size was 3.29.

In the township the population was spread out, with 29.7% under the age of 18, 8.6% from 18 to 24, 30.3% from 25 to 44, 21.5% from 45 to 64, and 9.9% who were 65 years of age or older. The median age was 36 years. For every 100 females, there were 122.5 males. For every 100 females age 18 and over, there were 114.2 males.

The median income for a household in the township was $52,115, and the median income for a family was $54,886. Males had a median income of $32,305 versus $26,154 for females. The per capita income for the township was $20,808. About 3.4% of families and 5.8% of the population were below the poverty line, including 8.5% of those under age 18 and 2.4% of those age 65 or over.

References

Townships in McLeod County, Minnesota
Townships in Minnesota